Cherryblossom is a Japanese rock band from Tokyo, who debuted in 2007. Their initial release was the mini-album Riskygirl, which was followed by three singles and then in 2008 by a full album titled GO!. Cherryblossom are most commonly known for their singles, Dive To World, Cycle, and Sakura Rock, which were part of the soundtrack for the anime Katekyo Hitman Reborn!.

Band members
The band consists of four members:
Vocalists: Maico and Meeko
Guitar: Kuppa
Bass: 83 (stage name)
Drums: Yucchi

Discography

EPs
Riskygirl (2007)
Hoshizora Triangle (2009)

Albums
GO! (2008)
Jikuu (2011)
Complete Best Cherryblossom (2011)

Singles
Dive To World (2007)
Harukaze Lover Song (2008)
Cycle (2008)
Sakura Rock (2009)
Yume no Manual (2009)

References

Japanese rock music groups
Musical groups established in 2007
Pony Canyon artists
Musical groups from Aichi Prefecture